Those Southern Knights is a 1976 studio album by The Crusaders. It peaked at number 38 on the Billboard Top LPs chart, as well as number 9 on the Soul LPs chart and number 2 on the Top Jazz LPs chart.

It includes "Keep That Same Old Feeling" and "And Then There Was the Blues". The former peaked at number 21 on the Hot Soul Singles chart, while the latter peaked at number 92.

Track listing

Personnel
Credits adapted from liner notes.

The Crusaders
 Wayne Henderson – trombone
 Wilton Felder – tenor saxophone
 Joe Sample – keyboards
 Stix Hooper – drums, percussion
 Larry Carlton – guitar
 Robert "Pops" Popwell – bass guitar

Additional musicians
 Arthur Adams – guitar

Production
 Stewart Levine – production
 F. Byron Clark – recording, remix engineering
 Bernie Grundman – mastering
 Tom Wilkes – art direction
 Ethan Russell – photography

Charts

References

External links
 

1976 albums
The Crusaders albums
Albums produced by Stewart Levine
Blue Thumb Records albums
ABC Records albums
Albums recorded at Total Experience Recording Studios